The stick–slip phenomenon, also known as the slip–stick phenomenon or simply stick–slip, is the spontaneous jerking motion that can occur while two objects are sliding over each other.

Cause 
Below is a simple, heuristic description of stick–slip phenomena using classical mechanics that is relevant for engineering descriptions. However, in actuality, there is little consensus in academia regarding the actual physical description of stick–slip which follows the lack of understanding about friction phenomena in general. The generally agreed upon view is that stick–slip behavior results from common phonon modes (at the interface between the substrate and the slider) that are pinned in an undulating potential well landscape that un-pin (slip) and pin (stick) primarily influenced by thermal fluctuations. However, stick–slip frictional behaviour is encountered over a wide range of length scales from the atomic up to the tectonic, and there is no single underlying physical mechanism responsible for all manifestations.

The stiffness of the spring (shown in image below), the normal load at the interface (the weight of the slider), the duration of time the interface has existed (influencing chemical mass transport and bond formation), the original rate (velocity) of sliding (when the slider is in the slip phase) – all influence the behavior of the system.
A description using common phonons (rather than constitutive laws like Coulomb's friction model) provides explanations for noise that generally accompanies stick–slip through surface acoustic waves. The use of complicated constitutive models that lead to discontinuous solutions (see Painlevé paradox) end up requiring unnecessary mathematical effort (to support non-smooth dynamical systems) and do not represent the true physical description of the system. However, such models are very useful for low fidelity simulations and animation.

Engineering description

Stick–slip can be described as surfaces alternating between sticking to each other and sliding over each other, with a corresponding change in the force of friction. Typically, the static friction coefficient (a heuristic number) between two surfaces is larger than the kinetic friction coefficient.  If an applied force is large enough to overcome the static friction, then the reduction of the friction to the kinetic friction can cause a sudden jump in the velocity of the movement. The attached picture shows symbolically an example of stick–slip.

V is a drive system, R is the elasticity in the system, and M is the load that is lying on the floor and is being pushed horizontally. When the drive system is started, the Spring R is loaded and its pushing force against load M increases until the static friction coefficient between load M and the floor is not able to hold the load anymore. The load starts sliding and the friction coefficient decreases from its static value to its dynamic value. At this moment the spring can give more power and accelerates M. During M's movement, the force of the spring decreases, until it is insufficient to overcome the dynamic friction. From this point, M decelerates to a stop. The drive system however continues, and the spring is loaded again etc.

Examples 
Examples of stick–slip can be heard from hydraulic cylinders, tractor wet brakes, honing machines etc. Special dopes can be added to the hydraulic fluid or the cooling fluid to overcome or minimize the stick–slip effect. Stick–slip is also experienced in lathes, mill centres, and other machinery where something slides on a slideway. Slideway oils typically list "prevention of stick–slip" as one of their features. Other examples of the stick–slip phenomenon include the music that comes from bowed instruments, the noise of car brakes and tires, and the noise of a stopping train. Stick–slip also has been observed in articular cartilage in mild loading and sliding conditions, which could result in an abrasive wear of the cartilage.
 
Another example of the stick–slip phenomenon occurs when musical notes are played with a glass harp by rubbing a wet finger along the rim of a crystal wine glass.  One animal that produces sound using stick–slip friction is the spiny lobster which rubs its antennae over smooth surfaces on its head. Another, more common example which produces sound using stick–slip friction is the grasshopper.

Stick–slip can also be observed on the atomic scale using a friction force microscope. In such case, the phenomenon can be interpreted using the Tomlinson model.

The behaviour of seismically-active faults is also explained using a stick–slip model, with earthquakes being generated during the periods of rapid slip.

The characteristic sound of basketball shoes squeaking on a court is produced by stick–slip contact between the rubber soles and the hardwood floor.

Stick–slip is the basic physical mechanism for the active control of friction by applying vibrations.

Researchers at University of California, San Diego developed a swarm of self-folding origami robots that use the stick–slip phenomenon for locomotion. Another robot that relies on stick–slip is the Kilobot.

Apparent stick–slip can even be observed in a system having no static friction force ("dynamic stiction")

References

External links
Simulation of stick-slip behaviour in a friction force microscope (movie)
Jianguo Wu, Ashlie Martini, "Atomic Stick-Slip," DOI: 10254/nanohub-r7771.1, 2009
Weston-Dawkes W., et al., "Designing Customizable Self-Folding Swarm Robots," 2017

Mechanical engineering
Friction